Dieter Haaßengier (30 May 1934 – 7 February 2023) was a German politician. A member of the Christian Democratic Union, he served in the Landtag of Lower Saxony from 1970 to 1976.

Haaßengier died in Garbsen on 7 February 2023, at the age of 88.

References

1934 births
2023 deaths
Christian Democratic Union of Germany politicians
Members of the Landtag of Lower Saxony
20th-century German politicians
People from the Province of Pomerania
People from Szczecinek County